The 2022 Swiss Cup Zürich took place on November 27 in Zürich, Switzerland.  It was the 34th iteration of the event.

Participants

Results

Prelims 

 the team advanced to the semi-finals

Semi-finals 

 the team advanced to the finals

Finals

References 

Swiss Cup
Swiss Cup
Swiss Cup